Tacoma is a suburb of the Central Coast region of New South Wales, Australia. It is part of the  local government area.

Tacoma is located on the northern bank of the Wyong River where it opens up onto Tuggerah Lake. It has a general store, a school, Tacoma Public School and a Fishermans Co-operative. It is also the home of the Wyong Lakes Magpies Australian Football Club.

References

Suburbs of the Central Coast (New South Wales)